The New Zealand cricket team toured England in the 1999 cricket season, playing 12 first-class matches including four Tests against England.

New Zealand won the Test series 2–1, with one match drawn. As a result, England fell to the bottom of the Wisden Test rankings.

Overview
At Edgbaston, in a low scoring match, an England team without a coach (as David Lloyd has resigned after their exit from the World Cup) surprised themselves by beating New Zealand by 7 wickets.   Trailing by 100 runs on first innings, New Zealand could only set England 208 to win the match collapsing to only 107 all out in their second innings.   England lost one wicket late on day 2 but of significant importance is that the cloud cover which had prevailed for the previous two days (during which 21 wickets had fallen) had disappeared.   New Zealand could manage only two more wickets as Hussain, Thorpe and fledgling all-rounder Alex Tudor took England to victory.   Tudor made 99 not out including 21 fours.

Roger Twose admitted New Zealand were "bitterly disappointed" to lose the first test when interviewed by Channel 4 during the second test and their response was a resounding win at Lord's.   New Zealand bowled England out for a paltry 186 on a good batting wicket and then ground out 358 at barely 3 runs per over.   Leading by 172, England faced an uphill battle to even make New Zealand bat again.   With no batsman able to score more than 45 (Andrew Caddick at number 8 top scoring), England set New Zealand 60 to win - which they duly did by 9 wickets.   Chris Cairns took 8 wickets in the match including the celebrated Chris Read ducking what ended up being a leg stump yorker as he lost sight of Cairns's slower ball.

In the third test at Old Trafford, the rain largely saved England as they could only face 68 overs in their 2nd innings.   Alec Stewart made 83 not out to hold off defeat.   Nathan Astle and Craig McMillan scored centuries in New Zealand's 496/9 declared.

The series was therefore 1-1 heading into the final match at the Oval.   Another low scoring contest (something of a feature of this series) ensued.   Leading by 80 runs on first innings, again New Zealand somewhat collapsed to 162 all out in their second innings, Cairns top scoring by some margin with 80 batting at number 8 including some huge sixes off Tufnell.   England therefore needed only 246 to win the match and series but fell well short at 162 with nobody able to stay with Michael Atherton who made 64.

This series is probably most memorable for:
 the all-round exploits of Chris Cairns - fit and very much in form in a career that was dogged by injuries.
 the new-ball combination of Cairns and Nash.
 the emergence of Daniel Vettori as a world class spinner.
 the rather "rudderless" England team who were without a coach and seemed to lack any sort of motivation on the field - despite the arrival of new captain Nasser Hussain.

At the end of the series, England had dropped below Zimbabwe in the Wisden world rankings and in a moment of black humour England's fans were heard to sing "We've got the worst team in the world" to the tune of the hymn "He's got the whole world in his hands".

1st Test

2nd Test

3rd Test

4th Test

References

Notes
 Playfair Cricket Annual 2000 
 Wisden Cricketers' Almanack 2000

External links
 CricketArchive itinerary

1999 in New Zealand cricket
1999 in English cricket
International cricket competitions from 1997–98 to 2000
1999